The Temple of the Feathered Serpent is the third largest pyramid at Teotihuacan, a pre-Columbian site in central Mexico (the term Teotihuacan, or Teotihuacano, is also used for the whole civilization and cultural complex associated with the site). This structure is notable partly due to the discovery in the 1980s of more than a hundred possibly sacrificial victims found buried beneath the structure. The burials, like the structure, are dated to between 150 and 200 CE. The pyramid takes its name from representations of the Mesoamerican "feathered serpent" deity which covered its sides.  These are some of the earliest-known representations of the feathered serpent, often identified with the much-later Aztec god Quetzalcoatl. "Temple of the Feathered Serpent" is the modern-day name for the structure; it is also known as the Temple of Quetzalcoatl and the Feathered Serpent Pyramid.

Location

The Temple of the Feathered Serpent is located at the southern end of the Avenue of the Dead, Teotihuacan's main thoroughfare, within the Ciudadela complex. The Ciudadela (Spanish, "citadel") is a structure with high walls and a large courtyard surrounding the temple. The Ciudadela’s courtyard is massive enough that it could house the entire adult population of Teotihuacán within its walls, which was estimated to be one hundred thousand people at its peak.  Within the Ciudadela there are several monumental structures, including the temple, two mansions north and south of the temple, and the Adosada platform. Built in the 4th century, the Adosada platform is located just in front (west) of the Temple of the Feathered Serpent, obscuring its view.

Architecture

The Feathered Serpent Pyramid is a six-level step pyramid built in the talud-tablero style.  The outside edges of each level are decorated with feathered serpent heads alternating with those of another snake-like creature, often identified as Tlaloc. Nevertheless, Mary Ellen Miller and Karl Taube claim that these heads may represent a "war serpent", while Michael D. Coe claims, somewhat similarly, that they probably represent the "fire serpent" wearing a headdress with the Teotihuacan symbol for war. In the eyes of these figures there is a spot for obsidian glass to be put in, so when the light hits, its eyes would glimmer. In antiquity the entire pyramid was painted – the background here was blue with carved sea shells providing decoration. Under each row of heads are bas-reliefs of the full feathered serpent, in profile, also associated with water symbols. These and other designs and architectural elements are more than merely decorative, suggesting "strong ideological significance", although there is no consensus just what that significance is. Some interpret the pyramid's iconography as cosmological in scope – a myth of the origin of time or of creation – or as calendrical in nature. Others find symbols of rulership, or war and the military.

Today the pyramid is largely hidden by the Adosada platform hinting at a political restructuring of Teotihuacan during the fourth century CE, perhaps a "rejection of autocratic rule" in favour of a collective leadership. Following excavations in the early 20th century, a section of a façade on the monument's west side was discovered. This section is believed to date from the late 3rd century. Fantastic and rare carvings on the surfaces show depictions of the feathered serpent deity, other gods, and seashells on panels on either side of a staircase.

Condition and conservation

Since the structure has been exposed to the elements for the entire duration of its history, rain and groundwater, crystallization of soluble salts on the surface, erosion, and biological growth have caused deterioration and loss of stone on the surface. Tourist visitation also accelerated the deterioration. In 2004, the Temple of Quetzalcoatl was listed in the 2004 World Monuments Watch by the World Monuments Fund. The organization provided assistance for conservation in cooperation with the Instituto Nacional de Antropología e Historia and with help from American Express.

Burials at the pyramid

Two hundred or more sacrificial burials were found at the pyramid, believed to be carried out as part of the dedication of the temple.  The burials are grouped in various locations, the significance of which is not yet understood.  While there are burials of both men and women, the males outnumber the females.  The males were accompanied by the remains of weapons and accoutrements, such as necklaces of human teeth, that lead researchers to conclude that they were warriors, probably warriors in service to Teotihuacan rather than captives from opposing armies. The richness of the burial goods generally increases toward the center of the pyramid. At least three degrees of status have been identified, although there is no indication of a dead ruler or other obvious focal point.

Later discoveries

In late 2003 a tunnel beneath the Temple of the Feathered Serpent was accidentally discovered by Sergio Gómez Chávez and Julie Gazzola, archaeologists of the National Institute of Anthropology and History (INAH). After days of heavy rainstorm Gómez Chávez noticed that a nearly three-foot-wide sinkhole occurred near the foot of the temple pyramid.

First trying to examine the hole with a flashlight from above Gómez could see only darkness, so tied with a line of heavy rope around his waist he was lowered by several colleagues, and descending into the murk he realized it was a perfectly cylindrical shaft. At the bottom he came to rest in apparently ancient construction – a man-made tunnel, blocked in both directions by immense stones. Gómez was aware that archaeologists had previously discovered a narrow tunnel underneath the Pyramid of the Sun, and supposed he was now observing a kind of similar mirror tunnel, leading to a subterranean chamber beneath Temple of the Feathered Serpent. He decided initially to elaborate a clear hypothesis and to obtain approval. Meanwhile, he erected a tent over the sinkhole to preserve it from the hundreds of thousands of tourists who visit Teotihuacán. Researchers reported that the tunnel was believed to have been sealed in 200 CE.

Preliminary planning of the exploration and fundraising took more than six years. Before the start of excavations, beginning in the early months of 2004, Dr. Victor Manuel Velasco Herrera determined with the help of ground-penetrating radar and a team of some 20 archaeologists and workers the approximate length of the tunnel and the presence of internal chambers. They scanned the earth under the Ciudadela, returning every afternoon to upload the results to Gómez's computers. By 2005, the digital map was complete. The archaeologists explored the tunnel with a remote-controlled robot called Tlaloc II-TC, equipped with an infrared camera and a laser scanner that generates 3D visualization to perform three dimensional register of the spaces beneath the temple. A small opening in the tunnel wall was made and the scanner captured the first images, 37 meters into the passage.

In 2009, the government granted Gómez permission to dig. By the end of 2009 archaeologists of the INAH located the entrance to the tunnel that leads to galleries under the pyramid, where the remains of rulers of the ancient city might have been deposited. In August 2010 Gómez Chávez, director of Tlalocan Project: Underground Road announced the advancement of investigation conducted by INAH in the tunnel closed nearly 1,800 years ago by Teotihuacan dwellers. INAH team, consisted of about 30 persons supported with national and international advisors of the highest scientific level, intended to enter the tunnel in September–October 2010. This excavation, the deepest made at the pre-Columbian site, was part of the commemorations of the 100th anniversary of archaeological excavations at Teotihuacan and its opening to public.

It was mentioned that the underground passage runs under Feathered Serpent Temple, and the entrance is located a few meters away from the temple at the expected place, designedly sealed with large boulders nearly 2,000 years ago. The hole that had appeared during the 2003 storms was not the actual entrance. A vertical shaft, almost 5 meters wide, accesses the tunnel: it goes 14 meters deep, and the entrance leads to a nearly 100-meter-long corridor that ends in a series of underground galleries in the rock. After archaeologists broke ground at the entrance of the tunnel, a staircase and ladders (and later an elevator) were installed to allow easy access to the subterranean site. Work advanced at a slow and careful pace. Excavating was done manually, with spades. Nearly 1,000 tons of soil and debris were removed from the tunnel. The rich array of objects unearthed included: large spiral seashells, jaguar bones, pottery, fragments of human skin, wooden masks covered with inlaid rock jade and quartz, elaborate necklaces, rings, greenstone crocodile teeth and human figurines, crystals shaped into eyes, beetle wings arranged in a box, sculptures of jaguars, and hundreds of metallized spheres. The mysterious globes lay in both the north and south chambers. Ranging from 40 to 130 millimetres, the balls have a core of clay and are covered with a yellow jarosite formed by the oxidation of pyrite. According to George Cowgill from Arizona State University, "Pyrite was certainly used by the Teotihuacanos and other ancient Mesoamerican societies. Originally the spheres would have shone brilliantly. They are indeed unique, but I have no idea what they mean." All these artifacts were deposited deliberately and pointedly, as if in offering to appease the gods.

At the end of the tunnel is a chamber representing the underworld, or a microcosm of the Teotihuacan civilization. About 17 metres beneath the pyramid's center, a miniature mountainous landscape was used to hold objects, including a rubber ball (used in the Mesoamerican ballgame) representing the Sun. Pools of liquid mercury in some of the tiny valleys represented lakes. Also found were four greenstone statues, wearing garments and beads, and their open eyes would have shone with precious minerals. Two of the figurines were still in their original positions, leaning back and apparently contemplating up at the axis where the three planes of the universe meet – probably the founding shamans of Teotihuacan, guiding pilgrims to the sanctuary, and carrying bundles of sacred objects used to perform rituals, including pendants and pyrite mirrors, which were perceived as portals to other realms. The walls and ceiling of the tunnel were found to have been carefully impregnated with mineral powder composed of magnetite, pyrite, and hematite, providing a special brightness to the place and to give the effect of standing under the stars as a peculiar re-creation of the underworld.

After each new segment was cleared, the 3D scanner documented the progress. By 2015 nearly 75,000 fragments of artifacts have been discovered, studied, cataloged, analyzed and, when possible, restored. The significance of these new discoveries is publicly explored in a major exhibition which opened at the end of September 2017 at the De Young Museum in San Francisco.

Relation to the calendar

There was an apparent correlation between the Temple of the Feathered Serpent and the calendar. The pyramid also is thought to contain two hundred and sixty feathered serpent heads between the platforms.  Each of these feathered serpents also contains an open area in its mouth.  This open area is big enough to put a place holder in.  Thus, it is believed that the people of Teotihuacán would move this place marker around the pyramid to represent the ritual calendar.  When a spiritual day would arrive the people would gather within the walls of the Ciudadela and celebrate the ritual.

Political influences
The Temple of the Feathered Serpent was not only a religious center but also a political center.  The rulers of Teotihuacán were not only the leaders of men; they were also the spiritual leaders of the city. The two mansions near the pyramid are thought to have been occupied by powerful families.

An interesting feature of the Feathered Serpent Pyramid is that there are examples of a shift in power or ideology in Teotihuacán and for the Pyramid itself.  The construction of the Adosada platform came much later than the Feathered Serpent Pyramid.  The Adosada platform is built directly in front of the pyramid and blocks its front view. Thus, it is thought that the political leaders lost favor or that the ideology of the Feathered Serpent Pyramid lost virtue, and so was covered up by the Adosada.

Gallery

References

Sources 
  (1993) "Human Sacrifice at the Temple of the Feathered Serpent: Recent Discoveries at Teotihuacan" Kathleen Berrin, Esther Pasztory, eds., Teotihuacan, Art from the City of the Gods, Thames and Hudson, Fine Arts Museums of San Francisco, .
 
  (2002) "Ritual Sacrifice and the Feathered Serpent Pyramid at Teotihuacán, México", Foundation for the Advancement of Mesoamerican Studies, Inc., accessed September 2008.
  (2003) "Social Differentiation at Teotihuacan" in Mesoamerican Elites: An Archaeological Assessment, Diane Z. Chase, Arlen F. Chase, eds., University of Oklahoma Press, .
 
 
  (2004) "Victims of the Victims, Human trophies worn by sacrificed soldiers from the Feathered Serpent Pyramid, Teotihuacan", Ancient Mesoamerica, vol. 5, pp. 1–15.

External links
Teotihuacan Research Laboratory
 Ancient Mesoamerica (journal)

Teotihuacan
Buildings and structures in Mesoamerica